Franco Sassi (26 February 1912 – 11 November 1993) was an Italian painter, printmaker and engraver.

Biography 

He started his career as a graphic designer at the time when lithographic engraving was still made on the Alois Senefelder stone. As a teenager he received his initial training at the Borsalino lithographic workshop in Alessandria, the town where he lived.

In the 1930s he became friend with the engraver Cino Bozzetti, of whom he was a follower in Chalcographic Art. He took part in World War II  in Slovenia; several portraits and caricatures of superiors and fellow soldiers witness this experience. He loved his native land, which he represented in the bright views of the river landscape, as well as in the sketches and drawings of Mulberry trees, clouds and clods. In the last decades of his production the vision of his land developed into the fantastic naturalism of the so-called "monsters" and the chromatic explosion of the watercolours. His production ranges from charcoal and sanguine portraits, caricatures, white and black drawings to oil paintings, watercolours, etchings and lithographic prints.

His works were shown in several collective and personal exhibitions with great public and critical participation. Some of his works are kept at the Pinacoteca Civica of Alessandria and the Civica Raccolta Achille Bertarelli in Milan. Since 2009 the Department of prints and drawings of the British Museum in London has acquired five etchings that may be dated between 1970 and 1980.

References
Franco Sassi, L'immagine e il sogno, Province of Alessandria, 1995.
Franco Sassi: uno specchio lontano, City of Alessandria, 1996.
F. Decaria and F. Sottomano, Franco Sassi, la magia in un segno, Piedmont Region, 1998.

External links
Official website
The prints collected at the British Museum
The prints collected at the Bagnocavallo Museum in Ravenna

1912 births
1993 deaths
People from the Province of Alessandria
20th-century Italian painters
Italian male painters
Italian printmakers
20th-century printmakers
20th-century Italian male artists